Michaela Dolinová (born 16 March 1964 in Třinec, Czechoslovakia) is a Czech actress and TV presenter. She studied in Prague before moving to the Kladno theatre where she played in a variety of classical roles. She also performed in the Semafor Theatre in Prague with fellow actor Josef Dvořák.

In 1993 she moved to Musical Theatre Karlín featuring in several musicals in a range of different roles.

After working as a weather girl on television for several years, she is currently a presenter on TV breakfast show Snídaně s Novou (Breakfast with Nova) which airs on the Czech TV channel Nova.

Personal life 
She lives in Prague with her husband and two daughters, Julinka and Tereza.

Filmography 
 Ulice (2005) - TV series
 Ordinace v růžové zahradě (2005) - TV series
 Agáta (1999)
 Taneční hodiny pro starší a pokročilé (1991)
 Uzavřený okruh (1989)
 Chlapci a chlapi (1988)
 Jak básníci přicházejí o iluze (1985)

References

External links 
 
 
Dolinová se tajně vdala, o svatbě mluvit nechce (iDnes.cz) 

1964 births
Living people
People from Třinec
Czech television actresses
Czech television personalities
20th-century Czech actresses
21st-century Czech actresses
Prague Conservatory alumni